A red Russian is usually made up of equal parts vodka and either cherry liqueur or strawberry schnapps and served with ice. It can also be prepared with cranberry juice or tomato juice.

See also
 List of cocktails
 White Russian (cocktail)

References

Cocktails with fruit liqueur
Cocktails with vodka
Cocktails with cranberry juice
Cocktails with tomato juice